Carve Her Name with Pride is a 1958 British war drama film based on the book of the same name by R. J. Minney.

The film, directed by Lewis Gilbert, is based on the true story of Special Operations Executive agent Violette Szabo, GC, who was captured and executed while serving in Nazi-occupied France. Szabo was played by Virginia McKenna.

Plot
Violette Bushell is a young woman whose father is English, and whose mother is French, living in London early in the Second World War. She meets French Army officer Etienne Szabo, stationed in the city, and they become engaged to be married. They have a daughter, Tania, but Etienne never sees the child, as he is killed fighting in the North African front; Violette Szabo and her daughter move into her parents' home.

Because of her linguistic skills, the widowed Szabo is recruited as a spy by the Special Operations Executive (SOE) for operations in France. On her first mission, she is teamed with Captain Tony Fraser (Paul Scofield), a man she had met earlier socially and liked. She arrives by small plane in France, and shares a train compartment to Rouen with curious German soldiers. The French Resistance group Fraser had set up in Rouen has been betrayed. The job of the new arrivals is to contact any survivors and to blow up a major railway viaduct. One Resistance member who Szabo contacts tells her that another survivor, a garage mechanic (André Maranne), is suspect, but Szabo takes the risk of meeting him anyway. He informs her that only three of 98 group members remain. Nonetheless, she persuades him to try to blow up the viaduct. Szabo is picked up and questioned by the Gestapo. She is released, and meets in Paris with Fraser, who congratulates her: The viaduct was destroyed.

They return to Britain, and Szabo reluctantly agrees to another mission. Once again, she is under Fraser's command, this time in the Limoges region. She sets out with a guide to contact the various Resistance units to coordinate their actions. She and her guide become involved in a firefight with German soldiers. They are outnumbered and they flee. Szabo injures her ankle, and she insists on remaining behind. She runs out of ammunition and is captured.

Though tortured, she defiantly refuses to provide any information. Eventually she is reunited with two fellow women agents she had befriended during their initial training, Lilian Rolfe and Denise Bloch, in a Nazi prison. As Allied forces advance on Paris, the women are placed on a train for Germany. When the train is bombed by Allied aircraft, the women have a chance to attempt to escape, but Szabo instead fetches water for male prisoners. One of them is Fraser. That night, Szabo and Fraser acknowledge their love for each other.

The men and women are separated. The three women are taken to a concentration camp, where they are executed.

After the war, Tania and her grandparents go to Buckingham Palace, where King George VI gives the child her mother's posthumous George Cross. Afterwards, they meet Fraser.

Cast

Virginia McKenna as Violette Szabo
Paul Scofield as Tony Fraser
Jack Warner as Mr. Charles Bushell, Violette's father
Denise Grey as Mrs. Reine Bushell, Violette's mother
Alain Saury as Etienne Szabo
Maurice Ronet as Jacques
Anne Leon as Lilian Rolfe
Sydney Tafler as Potter
Avice Landone as Vera Atkins, assistant to Colonel Buckmaster
Nicole Stéphane as Denise Bloch
Noel Willman as Interrogator
Bill Owen as NCO Instructor, who trains Szabo, Rolfe and Bloch
Billie Whitelaw as Winnie
William Mervyn as Colonel Maurice Buckmaster
Michael Goodliffe as Coding expert
André Maranne as Garage Man
Harold Lang as Commandant Suhren
Michael Caine as Thirsty Prisoner on Train (uncredited)
Victor Beaumont as German Colonel (uncredited)
George Mikell as German Officer (uncredited)
John Moulder-Brown as Child (uncredited)

Production
Don Sharp directed second unit.

Box office
The film was one of the twelve most popular at the British box office in 1958. Kinematograph Weekly listed it as being "in the money" at the British box office in 1958.

Award nominations
BAFTA Award for Best Actress – Virginia McKenna

The real Violette Szabo

With her blonde hair and handsome angular features, Virginia McKenna bears no resemblance to the real Violette Szabo, a brunette with dark eyes standing at less than 5 ft 5in tall. McKenna gives Szabo a marked south London accent brushed with received pronunciation, her performance being in the tradition of the "stiff upper lipped" strictly class-structured heroine that would be anticipated by audiences in the atmosphere of a pre-Bond 1950s Britain. The film itself, released in 1958, does not show the full horror of Szabo's treatment in captivity, especially in Ravensbrück concentration camp, or the true manner of her execution, but it gives a broad impression of her bravery and fortitude.

Szabo was described in the citation to her posthumous George Cross as having shown a "magnificent example of courage and steadfastness", by her daughter, Tania, in the title of her 2007 book about her mother's missions, as "young, brave, and beautiful", and by fellow SOE agent, Odette Sansom, GC, who survived Ravensbrück, as "the bravest of us all".

Denise Bloch and Lilian Rolfe were fellow SOE agents, and were executed with Violette Szabo on 5 February 1945 in Ravensbrück. Colonel Maurice Buckmaster was head of SOE F Section; Vera Atkins was his assistant and the section's intelligence officer, with special responsibility for female agents.

Vera Atkins, Odette Sansom, and Leslie Fernandez, one of Szabo's SOE instructors and a field agent himself, were advisors on the film.

The role played by Paul Scofield, Tony Fraser, was created for dramatic purposes, but is based upon Szabo's actual male colleague on her missions to France, and organiser of the Salesman circuit, Philippe Liewer ('Major Charles Staunton').

"The Life That I Have"
The poem, "The Life That I Have", also known as "Yours", recited to Violette by her husband Etienne, was once believed to have been written especially for the film, but was in fact the actual code poem given to her in March 1944 by the SOE cryptographer Leo Marks, and written by him on Christmas Eve 1943 in memory of his girlfriend, Ruth, who had recently died in a plane crash. Marks, who became a scriptwriter after the war, would only let the poem be used on condition that his authorship was not revealed.

References

External links 
 Carve Her Name with Pride at the British Film Institute
 
 
 
 

1958 films
1950s war drama films
British spy drama films
Films about the French Resistance
Films based on biographies
Films directed by Lewis Gilbert
Films shot at Pinewood Studios
Special Operations Executive
Western Front of World War II films

World War II films based on actual events
World War II spy films
British war drama films
Films scored by William Alwyn
Films set in London
Films set in France
Films set in Paris
1958 drama films
1950s English-language films
1950s British films